The 2006 Texas General Election was held on Tuesday, 7 November 2006, in the U.S. state of Texas. Voters statewide elected the Governor, Lieutenant Governor, Attorney General, Comptroller of Public Accounts, Commissioner of the General Land Office, Commissioner of Agriculture, and one Railroad Commissioner. Statewide judicial offices up for election were the chief justice and four justices of the Texas Supreme Court, and the presiding judge and two judges of the Texas Court of Criminal Appeals.

The Texas United States Senate election, 2006 and the Texas United States House elections, 2006 were conducted as part of the Texas General Election.

Democratic and Republican candidates were selected in party primaries held 7 March 2006. In races without a majority, the runoff elections were held on 11 April 2006.

Libertarian candidates were selected at the Texas Libertarian Convention 10 June 2006 in Houston (the Libertarian Party does not use a primary system to select candidates).

Independent candidates had 60 days after the primaries are over (from 8 March, one day after the primary election, to 11 May 2006) to collect the necessary signatures to secure a place on the ballot. For statewide elections, state law proscribes the collection of one percent of voters casting ballots in the prior gubernatorial election (for 2006, this equates to 45,540 signatures) from registered voters that did not vote in either primary or any runoffs. If there was a primary runoff for the office an independent candidate is seeking, the petition process shrank to only 30 days, from 12 April (one day after the runoff elections) to 11 May 2006.

United States Senator

Governor

Lieutenant governor

Attorney general

Comptroller of Public Accounts

Commissioner of the General Land Office

Commissioner of Agriculture

Railroad Commissioner

Texas Supreme Court

Chief Justice, Unexpired term
 Republican  Wallace Jefferson, Incumbent
 Libertarian  Tom Oxford
 Green (Write-in)  Charles E. Waterbury

Justice, Place 2
 Republican  Don Willett, Incumbent
 Democrat  William E. Moody
 Libertarian  Wade Wilson

Justice, Place 4
 Republican  David M. Medina, Incumbent
 Libertarian  Jerry Adkins

Justice, Place 6
 Republican  Nathan Hecht, Incumbent
 Libertarian  Todd Phillipp
 Independent (declared)  Petition deadline has passed for ballot access, but may run as write-in candidate
 William W. McNeal

Justice, Place 8, Unexpired term
 Republican  Phil Johnson, Incumbent
 Libertarian  Jay H. Cookingham

Texas Court of Criminal Appeals

Presiding Judge
 Republican  Sharon Keller, Incumbent
 Democrat  J.R. Molina

Judge, Place 7
 Republican  Barbara Parker Hervey, Incumbent
 Libertarian  Quanah Parker

Judge, Place 8
 Republican  Charles Holcomb, Incumbent
 Libertarian  Dave Howard

Legislative elections

Sixteen Texas Senate seats and all 150 Texas House of Representatives seats are up for election in 2006. The senators and representatives elected in 2006 will serve in the Eightieth Texas Legislature, while the senators will also serve in the Eighty-first Texas Legislature.

Texas Senate
Fifteen of the sixteen elections for the Texas Senate are contested to some extent. In the District 3 race, Robert Nichols won his Republican primary and will be unopposed in the fall election.

There will be at least five new members of the Senate. These current senators will not return:

Texas House of Representatives
In the Texas House of Representatives, 118 of the 150 seats will be contested in the November 2006 election. Thirty races will be uncontested after the primary elections on 7 March 2006; the remaining two will be determined in the primary runoffs on 11 April 2006.

There will be at least 20 new members of the House of Representatives. Two Democratic and five Republican incumbents were defeated in the primaries. These current representatives will not return:

State Board of Education
Only contested elections are listed.

Member, State Board of Education, District 3
 Republican  Tony Cunningham
 Democrat  Rick Agosto

Member, State Board of Education, District 5
 Republican  Ken Mercer
 Libertarian  Bill Oliver

Member, State Board of Education, District 9
 Republican  Don McLeroy, Incumbent
 Democrat  Maggie Charleton

Member, State Board of Education, District 10
 Republican  Cynthia Dunbar
 Libertarian  Martin Thomen

Member, State Board of Education, District 12
 Republican  Geraldine "Tincy" Miller, Incumbent
 Libertarian  Matthew Havener

Member, State Board of Education, District 15
 Republican  Bob Craig, Incumbent
 Libertarian  Brandon Stacker

Courts of Appeal District elections
Only contested elections are listed.

1st Court of Appeals District

Place 9
 Republican  Elsa Alcala, Incumbent
 Democrat  Jim Sharp

3rd Court of Appeals District

Place 2
 Republican  Alan Waldrop, Incumbent
 Democrat  Jim Sybert Coronado

Place 5
 Republican  David Puryear, Incumbent
 Democrat  Mina A. Brees

Place 6
 Republican  Bob Pemberton, Incumbent
 Democrat  Bree Buchanan

4th Court of Appeals District

Place 3
 Republican  Rebecca Simmons, Incumbent
 Democrat  Richard Garcia, Jr.

Place 4
 Republican  Steve Hilbig
 Democrat  Dan Pozza

Place 5
 Republican  Karen Angelini, Incumbent
 Democrat  Lauro A. Bustamante

Place 7
 Republican  Phylis Speedlin, Incumbent
 Democrat  Eddie DeLaGarza

6th Court of Appeals District

Place 2
 Republican  Bailey C. Moseley
 Democrat  Ben Franks

13th Court of Appeals District

Place 2
 Democrat  Federico "Fred" Hinojosa, Incumbent
 Republican  Rose Vela

14th Court of Appeals District

Place 6
 Republican  Richard Edelman, Incumbent
 Democrat  Leora T. Kahn

References

See also
 United States midterm elections, 2006
 United States congressional elections, 2006
 United States Senate elections, 2006
 United States House elections, 2006
 United States gubernatorial elections, 2006

 
Texas